The forest-steppe marmot (Marmota kastschenkoi) is a rodent species of the marmot genus found in south-central Russia. It has traditionally been considered a subspecies of the similar, more southerly distributed gray marmot (M. baibacina), but was separated mainly due to different diploid numbers. It hibernates for about 6 months starting in August or September.

In 2011, it was estimated that the forest-steppe marmot population consisted of about 14,000–16,000 individuals and had been stable over the last several decades, but earlier estimates have been both somewhat above and significantly below this figure.

References

Marmots
Rodents of Asia
Mammals of Russia
Mammals described in 1956